Victoria Adaobi Obasi  (born 14 April 1952) is the current substantive vice chancellor of Imo State University. She hails from Ogboko in Ideato South Local Government Area of Imo State Nigeria. Between 2011–2013, she was commissioner for education in Imo State.

Early life, education and marriage 
Victoria Adaobi Obasi is the daughter of Chief Fred and Ezinne Felicia Nnoham. Obasi started her early education at Holy Rosary Primary school, Oguta and later proceeded to Holy Rosary Secondary, Ihioma. She also attended Alvan Ikoku Federal College of Education, Owerri. Obasi got her bachelor's (1984), masters' (1985) and doctorate (1989) degrees from University of Hull, England. She did her National Youth Service Corps at Women Training College, Enugu (1980). Adaobi married Chief Charles Obasi of Dim Na Nume in Isu Local Government Area of Imo State and has five children.

Awards
She won the Bursary Award for Excellence, University of Hull three times consecutively in 1987,1988 and 1989.

Publications
She has written five books, including The implementation of continuous assessment in secondary schools in Imo State, Nigeria, and published journal articles in international journals.

Affiliations
She is a member of professional bodies in Nigeria such as Nigeria Academy of Education, Curriculum Organization of Nigeria (CON), and in other countries such as College of Preceptor England (CPE) and World Council of Curriculum and Instruction (WCCI)

References 

1952 births
Living people
Nigerian women academics
Igbo people
Vice-Chancellors of Nigerian universities
Academic staff of Imo State University
People from Imo State